The Central and Western District Council is the district council for the Central and Western District in Hong Kong. It is one of 18 such councils. The Central and Western District Council currently consists of 15 members, of which the district is divided into 15 constituencies, electing a total of 15 members. The last election was held on 24 November 2019.

History
The Central and Western District Council was established on 18 March 1982 under the name of the Central and Western District Board as the result of the colonial Governor Murray MacLehose's District Administration Scheme reform. The District Board was partly elected with the ex-officio Urban Council members, as well as members appointed by the Governor until 1994 when last Governor Chris Patten refrained from appointing any member.

The Central and Western District Board became Central and Western Provisional District Board after the Hong Kong Special Administrative Region (HKSAR) was established in 1997 with the appointment system being reintroduced by Chief Executive Tung Chee-hwa. The Central and Western District Council was established on 1 January 2000 after the first District Council election in 1999. The council has become fully elected when the appointed seats were abolished in 2011 after the modified constitutional reform proposal was passed by the Legislative Council in 2010.

The Central and Western Board was largely non-partisan in the 1980s. In the 1985 election, an electoral coalition of 12 incumbents based on personal network surrounding Vincent Ko Hon-chiu of the Hong Kong People's Association, later the board chairman, contested in the election, winning 10 seats in total. The board gradually divided into liberal and conservative blocs in the late 1980s and split into pro-democracy United Democrats of Hong Kong (UDHK) and the conservative Liberal Democratic Federation of Hong Kong (LDF) which were formed in 1990.

The Democratic Party, the merger of UDHK and Meeting Point, took control of the board from 1994 to 1997 after the abolishment of the appointed seats. The Democratic majority was offset by the pro-Beijing camp when appointed seats were reintroduced in 1997. In the 2003 tide of democracy after the July 1 protest, the pro-democrats formed the Central and Western Democratic Power for the 2003 election and won seven seats, which saw pro-democrat Legislative Councillor Cyd Ho defeating Ip Kwok-him of the Democratic Alliance for the Betterment of Hong Kong (DAB) in his long-held constituency of Kwun Lung. Democratic Party's Kam Nai-wai was able to take the chairmanship with the help of appointed member Wu Chor-nam. Kam's decision to co-operate with an appointed member sparked controversy which caused Kam to resign soon afterward.

The Democratic Party remained the largest party in the council until the 2007 election when the DAB surpassed the Democratic Party in the number of seats for the first time. In the by-elections in 2017 for Peak and Tung Wah, the pro-Beijing and pro-democracy camps took each of the seats, giving the Democrats the same numbers of seat as the DAB, both commanding five seats.

In the 2019 election amid the ongoing pro-democracy protests, the pro-democrats scored a historic landslide victory by taking 14 of the 15 seats, with DAB being completely wiped out from the council and its legislator Cheung Kwok-kwan being ousted in Sai Wan. The Democratic Party became the largest party with seven seats with Cheng Lai-king and Victor Yeung taking the chair and vice chair posts respectively.

Political control
Since 1982 political control of the council has been held by the following parties:

Political makeup

Elections are held every four years.

District result maps

Members represented
Starting from 1 January 2020:

Leadership

Chairs
Since 1985, the chairman is elected by all the members of the board:

Vice Chairs

Notes

References

External links
Official website

 
Districts of Hong Kong
District Councils of Hong Kong
Central and Western District, Hong Kong